Ktuts monastery (meaning beak in Armenian) is an abandoned 15th century Armenian monastery on the small island of Ktuts (Çarpanak) in Lake Van, Vaspurakan (present-day Turkey). According to tradition, the monastery was founded in the 4th century by Saint Gregory the Illuminator, after his return from Rome. It contained a hand of John the Baptist, which was kept in a reliquary now held at the Armenian Patriarchate of Jerusalem.

The first historical records referring to the monastery date to the 15th century, when it was known for its scriptorium. Manuscripts from this time are kept at the Matenadaran in Yerevan, Armenia. The monastery was most likely destroyed in an earthquake in 1648, before being rebuilt in the 18th century with funding from the people of Bagesh. It became one of the two seats of the diocese Lim and Ktuts.

At the time of the Hamidian massacres of 1894–1896, many refugees took shelter at the monastery. However this was not repeated during the Armenian genocide in 1915–1916, as access to the island was prevented by the Ottoman police. Since that time the monastery has been abandoned and only the church and its gavit remain.

Gallery

See also 
 Armenian Cathedral of the Holy Cross

References

External links 
 Ktuts' Anapat (pictures and information at Rensselaer Digital Collections)
 A recent photo of the island-monastery
 Armenian Monastery on Ktuts (Charpanak) Island, Lake Van: photo1, photo2, photo3, photo4, photo5, photo6, photo7,photo8, photo9, photo10, photo11

Armenian churches in Turkey
Christian monasteries established in the 15th century
Destroyed churches
Armenian buildings in Turkey